Lady Teresa Lorraine Waugh (née Onslow; born 26 February 1940) is a British novelist and translator. Waugh is the daughter of the 6th Earl of Onslow and his first wife, Pamela Dillon. On 1 July 1961, she married the author Auberon Waugh, eldest son of Evelyn Waugh.

Lady Teresa has translated such works as Anka Muhlstein's A Taste For Freedom: The life of Astolphe de Custine (2000), Benedetta Craveri's Madame Du Deffand and Her World (1994), and The Travels of Marco Polo (1984). In 1980, she translated the book of Iran Shah" Muahammed radah" from Persian to English under the name of " Replay to history, 'the story of shah life'".

She has also written her own novels, including Painting Water (1983), Waterloo Waterloo (1985), Intolerable Burden (1987), Song at Twilight (1989), The House (2002), Sylvia's Lot (1994) and The Gossips (1995). The Entertaining Book (1986) is not a novel but a book about food and wine written with her husband.

Auberon and Teresa Waugh had four children together:

 Margaret Sophia Laura Waugh (born 1962)
 Alexander Evelyn Michael Waugh (born 1963)
 Daisy Louisa Dominica Waugh (born 1967)
 Nathaniel Thomas Biafra Waugh (born 1968).

References

1940 births
Daughters of British earls
Living people
Teresa
English women novelists
Onslow family